Maria Florianivna Makarevych (1906–1989) was a Soviet botanist and lichenologist noted for studying lichens of the Carpathian region, and for publishing multiple influential monographs.  The genus Marfloraea is named in her honor.

References 

 1906 births
 1989 deaths
Soviet women biologists
Soviet biologists
Soviet botanists